The Heckler is a parody superhero appearing in media published by DC Comics. He first appeared in The Heckler #1 (cover-dated September 1992), the first of an ongoing series that ended with The Heckler #6 (cover-dated February 1993).

Publication history
Keith Giffen created the Heckler as "a superhero Bugs Bunny" because he wanted to work with Bugs Bunny but felt that DC Comics (who were publishing Bugs Bunny's comics at the time) would not have approved of his handling of the character. Tom and Mary Bierbaum, who had previously worked with Giffen on Legion of Super-Heroes, scripted the series over his plots and pencils for its entire run.

Though the Heckler's costume is covered with "Ha ha"s, Giffen told the Bierbaums that the Heckler must never laugh in this manner, since the "Ha ha" laugh was a signature aspect of the Creeper.

Though The Heckler #7 appeared in solicitations, no work was ever done on it beyond the plot and cover art. Humor comics were at the low point of their popularity, and after learning that sales on the series were "plummeting", Giffen approached DC and asked them to cancel The Heckler and leave #6 as the final issue.

Fictional character biography
Stuart "Stu" Moseley, co-owner of "EATS", a skid row diner in the ghetto section of Delta City, fights the injustices and slightly goofy criminal element as The Heckler, armed only with his sarcastic wit and a brightly colored costume. Stu's motivations and origins are unknown. Possibly he's just a glutton for punishment, for it seems that he receives no respect from his contemporaries in either his civilian or costumed alter ego's existence. 

While walking around as Stu, he comes across as slightly anal, frustrated and awkward. When wearing his costume, however, he seems to become a completely different person, endlessly confident and insanely daring with a talent for trickery and a smart-mouthed sense of humor that he uses to irritate, annoy and insult his foes until they usually pretty much defeat themselves in a style highly reminiscent of cartoon character Bugs Bunny (who artist/creator Keith Giffen admits was a major influence on the creation of the Heckler). He lacks any actual superpowers, yet has had a lengthy rap career as "piss trigger".

Supporting cast
Ledge - Stu's buddy and one of the very few people that's in on his Heckler alter-ego. Notable for his bad spelling, Ledge provides most of Stu's information regarding his opponents, keeping extensive dossiers on all major crime figures in Delta City.

François - Stu's slightly anal-retentive and obsessive but highly creative French cook at "Eats".

Mr. Dude - One of the patrons of "EATS". A leather jacket-clad overweight and middle-aged greaser who provides Stu with information on underworld activities and is regularly visited by the denizens of Delta City, including generals and monsignors, for advice on a vast variety of subjects.

Gus McDougal - Officer of the Delta City Police Department and ex-husband of the Minx. McDougal bemoans the changing face of Delta City's downtown core, and when we first see him he is weeping for the loss of "42 Varieties", a donut shop which has been bulldozed to make room for a McDonald's.

Mayor Clump - Delta City's mayor has a grey, undefined face. He wears either a "liberal" or "conservative" human face mask, depending on his audience.

The Minx - A beautiful gun-toting loner in dark glasses and a mohawk who has a teenage daughter named Axi. She hunts down criminals in Delta City for the reward money, but there is a distinct personal motivation involved as they all tend to be men she's previously gone on bad dates with. Much like Ledge, keeps copious computer files on the subject. Very much a parody of characters like The Punisher, Minx guns down criminals without consideration for due process and typically leaves no survivors.

X-Ms. - One of the Heckler's superheroic peers in Delta City. She defends the Christmas-themed section of Delta City called "Tinseltown".

Rabbi Zone and Dreidel - The Rabbi is part of the Brotherhood of the Zone Magi, an ancient order that "in eons past...enforced order in the cosmos". His undefined powers come from the Zone Patch, a purple circle in the palm of his right hand. Dreidel is Zone's adolescent sidekick, with the power to spin and travel at top speeds. Though they are meant to be a Jewish parody of Batman and Robin, they do not wear costumes.

Lex Concord - The Heckler never meets Concord, who was apparently the sole superhero for Colonial Delta City during the 1800s. Concord was lost, along with the entire settlement, during a previous invasion by the giant naked and inhumanly obese, curler-headed demonic entity called the Flying Buttress who simply licked up and devoured the entire town, buildings and all. By the time the Heckler comes across Colonial Delta's remains, the purple and green-clad Lex Concord (who has "Don't Tread On Me!" written on the forehead of his mask) has disappeared via time travel into a Jack Kirby-esque future.

Enemies
Boss Glitter - Incredibly dainty and theatrical mob boss of Delta City. Has a penchant for elaborate masks, frilly clothes and the ruthless removal of all those who fail him.

P.C. Rabid - Ultra-conservative media celebrity. Constantly instigating plans that present imagery used as an attempt to demonize the Heckler. Wears a human face mask; his real face is never revealed.

Bushwack'r - Bounty hunter who attempts to collect a price placed on the Heckler's head. A victim of his own constant bad luck, as his weapons and actions keep misfiring and injuring only himself. The character is clearly a parody of Wile E. Coyote, forming elaborate traps that backfire. In one panel of the issue, the biography of Chuck Jones is prominent.

El Gusano - Assassin hired by Boss Glitter that resembles a large faceless brown humanoid earthworm dressed in a snappy dress suit. Seems to be Latin in origin.

John Doe, The Generic Man - A complete blank slate. Attempted to take over Delta City by using his ability to rob his environment (including all inanimate objects and persons in the surrounding vicinity) of any of its individual characteristics. Often accompanied by his girlfriend or sidekick (depending), a young woman named Buckshot with exploding freckles.

Rachet Jaw and Kriegler - Trigger men for Boss Glitter. Rachet Jaw is a common-looking mobster with a mechanical lower jaw that unhinges to reveal a gun barrel. The gun can be fed through an ammo belt attached to his chin. Kriegler is Rachet Jaw's verbose, diminutive sidekick.

The Cosmic Clown - An android assassin from the stars. Humanoid, dresses like a clown. He is apparently one of a whole host of clown-shaped killer robots, who is at odds with his own clan and assumes that circuses and clowns on Earth are bent on murder.

C'est Hay - Psychopathic killer who resembles a scarecrow and is composed completely of hay and/or straw. Has delusions of being an actor, speaks in stilted tongue, as if emoting dialogue… that is when he's not singing and dancing.

The Four Mopeds of the Apocalypse - The erstwhile sidekicks of the Four Horsemen of the Apocalypse, the Mopeds are hanging out in various sections of Delta City, watching for signs of the end times. They include Skippy, Famine Lass, Plague Boy and Kid Pestilence and are charged with summoning the dread Flying Buttress, a gigantic and grotesquely fleshy floating female Elder God who is all digestive system and who had been exiled to another dimension by the Zone Magi.

Cuttin' Edge - This character never actually appeared in any comic. A crusader for edgy and cynical art who despises mass-appeal media, he was to be the villain of the intended seventh issue that was never completed.

Comic connections
The Keith Giffen-created DC Comics character Vext (who starred in the short-lived series of that name in 1998) was also a resident of the fictional Delta City. Delta City more recently appeared in an issue of Giffen's Doom Patrol series, undergoing considerable damage because of alternate reality versions of the team appearing and causing melee.

The Heckler appears on two panels on page 31 of JLA: Welcome to the Working Week alongside Plastic Man and Ambush Bug.
They seem to be leaving to get ready for a keg party.

In issue 12 of Book of Fate, Heckler makes a cameo in a bar called Warriors where he and some other lesser known heroes are talking about their crime fighting memories. The Heckler also is singing Memories are Made of These by Dean Martin.

The Heckler appears in the One-Star Squadron comic by DC Comics in December of 2021.

In other media
The Heckler appears as a summonable character in Scribblenauts Unmasked: A DC Comics Adventure.

References

(n.d.). Retrieved March 26, 2015, from https://m.facebook.com/photo.php?fbid=327960800607299&set=a.164867633583284.39053.141143869288994&type=3&theater

External links
Comic Vine

Comics characters introduced in 1992
DC Comics superheroes
DC Comics titles
Characters created by Keith Giffen
Parody superheroes